Gamaksan (감악산; 紺岳山) is the name of three mountains in South Korea:

 Gamaksan (Gyeonggi) in Paju, Yangju, and Yeoncheon, Gyeonggi-do
 Gamaksan (Gangwon) in Wonju, Gangwon-do, and Jecheon, Chungcheongbuk-do
 Gamaksan (South Gyeongsang) in Geochang, Gyeongsangnam-do